Pobeda (lit. Victory) is a railway station of Kiyevsky suburban railway line in Naro-Fominsky District of Moscow Oblast. It was opened in 1951 and rebuilt in 2020.

Gallery

References

Railway stations in Moscow Oblast
Railway stations of Moscow Railway
Railway stations in Russia opened in 1951